Swapnam is a 1973 Indian Malayalam-language  film, directed by Babu Nanthankode. The film stars Madhu, Nanditha Bose, Sudheer and Jose Prakash. It was released on 3 August 1973.

Cast

Madhu as Viswanathan
Nanditha Bose as Gauri
Sudheer as Bindu
Jose Prakash as Viswanathan's Brother
 Bahadoor as Kurup (Driver)
Adoor Bhavani
Aranmula Ponnamma as Viswanathan's Mother
Aryad Gopalakrishnan
Balan K. Nair
Kottarakkara Sreedharan Nair
Radhamani
 Radhadevi
Rani Chandra
 Raghu
 Narayankutty
 Sundharam
 Mohan
 C.R Lakshmi
 Roksana
 Susheela
 Vasanthi
 Vyjayanthimala

Soundtrack 

Playback singer Vani Jairam was introduced to Malayalam cinema through the song "Sourayudhathil".

References

External links
 

1973 films
1970s Malayalam-language films
Films scored by Salil Chowdhury
Films directed by Babu Nanthankode